Adrian Tudor (born 13 March 1985) is a Romanian professional basketball player.  He currently plays for the BCM U Pitesti club of the Liga Națională.

He represented Romania's national basketball team at the 2015 Eurobasket qualification, where he recorded most assists for his team.

References

External links
 Eurobasket.com Profile
 FIBA.com Profile
 Basketball-Reference.com Profile

1985 births
Living people
Romanian men's basketball players
Sportspeople from Constanța
Point guards